Zhong Weijun (born 20 April 1989) is a member and Captain of the China men's national volleyball team. On club level he plays for Bayi.

Awards

Clubs

National team

Senior team 
 2008 Asian Cup –  Bronze medal
 2010 Asian Cup –  Silver medal
 2011 Asian Championship –  Silver medal
 2012 Asian Cup –  Gold medal
 2013 Asian Championship –  Bronze medal

References

Chinese men's volleyball players
1989 births
Living people
Volleyball players at the 2010 Asian Games
Volleyball players at the 2014 Asian Games
Volleyball players at the 2018 Asian Games
Volleyball players from Shanxi
People from Changzhi
Asian Games competitors for China
21st-century Chinese people